The Shadow Cabinet of Bill English formed the official Opposition in the 46th and 47th New Zealand Parliaments while Bill English led the New Zealand National Party, which was the largest party not a member of the Government. English was elected National Party leader unopposed in October 2001. He led the Party to its worst-ever result at the 2002 general election and was replaced as leader by first-term MP Don Brash in October 2003.

Frontbench team

August 2002 
English reshuffled his party's portfolio allocations after the 2002 general election. With the party comprising only 27 MPs, every person in the National caucus was assigned a portfolio. Notably, first-term MP and former Reserve Bank Governor Don Brash was appointed to the Finance portfolio and ranked third.

October 2001 
English was elected to the National Party leadership in October 2001, succeeding Jenny Shipley. The list below contains a list of English's shadow ministers and their respective roles as announced October 2001. Of note was English's decision to retain the Finance portfolio, which he had held under Shipley and had indicated he would relinquish as leader. Instead, apparently under pressure for a more gradual transition, David Carter was appointed as an associate spokesperson for finance, and it was suggested that Carter would take the primary portfolio in March or April of the following year. Carter was eventually promoted to Finance spokesperson on 29 January 2002. Later changes to the National lineup included Richard Worth succeeding Max Bradford in Defence and Katherine Rich replacing John Luxton in Tourism, both in June 2002; Bradford and Luxton had announced they would not contest the 2002 election.

References

New Zealand National Party
English, Bill
2001 establishments in New Zealand
2003 disestablishments in New Zealand